The 154th New York Infantry Regiment (aka, "The Hardtack Regiment") was an infantry regiment in the Union Army during the American Civil War.

Service
The 154th New York Infantry was organized at Albion, New York beginning August 19, 1862 and mustered in for three years service on September 24, 1862 under the command of Colonel Addison G. Rice.

The regiment was attached to 1st Brigade, 2nd Division, XI Corps, Army of the Potomac, to October 1863, and Army of the Cumberland to April 1864. 2nd Brigade, 2nd Division, XX Corps, Army of the Cumberland and Army of Georgia, to June 1865.

The 154th New York Infantry mustered out of service June 11, 1865. Recruits and veterans were transferred to the 102nd New York Volunteer Infantry.

Detailed service
Left New York for Washington, D.C., September 30, 1862. Joined XI Corps at Fairfax, Va., October 2, 1862, and duty there until November 1. Movement to Warrenton, then to Germantown November 1–20. March to Fredericksburg, Va., December 10–15. At Falmouth, Va., until April 27, 1863. "Mud March" January 20–24. Chancellorsville Campaign April 27-May 6. Battle of Chancellorsville May 1–5. Gettysburg Campaign June 11-July 24. Battle of Gettysburg July 1–3. Pursuit of Lee July 5–24. At Bristoe Station until September 24. Movement to Bridgeport, Ala., September 24-October 3. March along line of Nashville & Chattanooga Railroad to Lookout Valley, Tenn., October 25–28. Reopening Tennessee River October 26–29. Battle of Wauhatchie, Tenn., October 28–29. Chattanooga-Ringgold Campaign November 23–27. Orchard Knob November 23. Tunnel Hill November 24–25. Missionary Ridge November 25. March to relief of Knoxville November 28-December 17. Duty in Lookout Valley until May 1864. Atlanta Campaign May 1-September 8. Demonstration on Rocky Faced Ridge May 8–11. Dug Gap or Mill Creek May 8. Battle of Resaca May 14–15. Near Cassville May 19. Advance on Dallas May 22–25. New Hope Church May 25. Battles about Dallas, New Hope Church, and Allatoona Hills May 26-June 5. Operations about Marietta and against Kennesaw Mountain June 10-July 2. Pine Hill June 11–14. Lost Mountain June 15–17. Gilgal or Golgotha Church June 15. Muddy Creek June 17. Noyes Creek June 19. Kolb's Farm June 22. Assault on Kennesaw June 27. Ruff's Station, Smyrna Camp Ground, July 4. Chattahoochie River July 5–17. Peachtree Creek July 19–20. Siege of Atlanta July 22-August 25. Operations at Chattahoochie River Bridge August 26-September 2. Occupation of Atlanta September 2-November 15. Expedition from Atlanta to Tuckum's Cross Roads October 26–29. Near Atlanta November 9. March to the sea November 15-December 10. Siege of Savannah December 10–21. Carolinas Campaign January to April 1865. Averysboro, N.C., March 16. Battle of Bentonville March 19–21. Occupation of Goldsboro March 24. Advance on Raleigh April 9–13. Occupation of Raleigh April 14. Bennett's House April 26. Surrender of Johnston and his army. March to Washington, D.C., via Richmond, Va., April 29-May 19. Grand Review of the Armies May 24.

Casualties
Total casualties for the regiment were 278; 2 officers and 81 enlisted men were killed or mortally wounded, and 2 officers and 193 enlisted men passed away from illness.

Commanders
 Colonel Addison G. Rice - provisional colonel during organization, he never received an official commission
 Colonel Patrick Henry Jones
 Colonel Lewis D. Warner
 Lieutenant Colonel Henry C. Loomis - commanded at the Battle of Chancellorsville after Col Jones was wounded in action
 Lieutenant Colonel Daniel B. Allen - commanded at the Battle of Gettysburg

Notable members
 Sergeant Amos Humiston, Company C - killed in action at the Battle of Gettysburg, he died clutching a photograph of his three children, which became a symbol of the war's affects on families and led to the creation of the National Homestead at Gettysburg, a residence for widows and orphans

See also

 List of New York Civil War regiments
 New York in the Civil War

References
 Dyer, Frederick H. A Compendium of the War of the Rebellion (Des Moines, IA: Dyer Pub. Co.), 1908.
 Dunkelman, Mark H. Brothers One and All: Esprit de Corps in a Civil War Regiment (Baton Rouge, LA: Louisiana State University Press), 2004. 
 -----. Camp James M. Brown: Jamestown's Civil War Rendezvous (Jamestown, NY: Fenton Historical Society), 1996.
 -----. Colonel Lewis D. Warner, an Appreciation: Written for the Observance of Col. L.D. Warner day and the 5th Annual Reunion of Descendants of the 154th New York Volunteers, July 7, 1990, Portville, New York (Portville, NY: Portville Historical and Preservation Society), 1990.
 -----. Marching with Sherman: Through Georgia and the Carolinas with the 154th New York (Baton Rouge, LA: Louisiana State University Press), 2012. 
 -----. Patrick Henry Jones: Irish American, Civil War General, and Gilded Age Politician (Baton Rouge, LA: Louisiana State University Press), 2015.  
 -----. War's Relentless Hand: Twelve Tales of Civil War Soldiers (Baton Rouge, LA: Louisiana State University Press), 2006. 
 Dunkelman, Mark H. and Michael Winey. The Hardtack Regiment: An Illustrated History of the 154th Regiment, New York State Infantry Volunteers (Rutherford, NJ: Fairleigh Dickinson University Press), 1981. 
Attribution

External links
 Regimental flag of the 154th New York Infantry
 154th New York Infantry monument at Gettysburg Battlefield
 Children of the Battlefield monument at Gettysburg Battlefield

Military units and formations established in 1862
Military units and formations disestablished in 1865
Infantry 154